Dame Jane Elisabeth Roberts,  (born August 1955) is a British psychiatrist and Labour Party politician.

She has been a consultant in child and adolescent psychiatry since 1994, and was medical director of Islington Primary Care Trust. She was leader of the London Borough of Camden from 2000 to 2005. She was chair of the Councillors Commission.

Honours
She was made a Dame Commander of the Order of the British Empire in 2004 for services to local government.

References

1955 births
Living people
20th-century English medical doctors
Dames Commander of the Order of the British Empire
People from Camden Town
Labour Party (UK) councillors
Date of birth missing (living people)
Place of birth missing (living people)
Councillors in the London Borough of Camden
Leaders of local authorities of England
Women councillors in England